József Somkuthy (20 April 1883 – 18 October 1961) was a Hungarian military officer and politician, who served as Minister of Defence for a month in 1936. From 1935 he was the Chief of Army Staff. After the death of Gyula Gömbös he resigned along with the whole members of the cabinet. He was retired. He emigrated to the United States in 1950, settling in Washington, D.C.

References
 Magyar Életrajzi Lexikon

1883 births
1961 deaths
People from Hunedoara County
People from the Kingdom of Hungary
Defence ministers of Hungary
Hungarian soldiers
Austro-Hungarian military personnel of World War I
Austro-Hungarian Army officers
Hungarian emigrants to the United States